Fasten Your Seatbelt may refer to:

Fasten Your Seatbelt (film), a 2013 South Korean film
Fasten Your Seatbelts, a 2014 Italian film
"Tarantula / Fasten Your Seatbelt", a 2005 single by Pendulum